Emiliya Dimitrova (born Emiliya Nikolova 26 December 1991) is a Bulgarian volleyball player. She is a member of the Bulgaria women's national volleyball team

She was part of the Bulgarian national team at the 2014 FIVB Volleyball Women's World Championship in Italy. and 2021 Women's European Volleyball League, winning a gold medal.

She played for Imoco Conegliano in 2014.

Clubs
  Slavia Sofia (2007–2009)
  Spes Volley Conegliano (2010–2011)
  C.S. Volei 2004 Tomis Constanța (Jan 2011 – May 2011)
  Spes Volley Conegliano (2011–2012)
  Yeşilyurt Istanbul (Jan 2012 – May 2012)
  Imoco Conegliano (2012–2015)
  Pallavolo Scandicci (2015–2016)
  NEC Red Rockets (2016–2017)
  Bursa (2017–2018)
  C.S.Targoviste (2018–2019)
  PTT Spor (2020–2021)

References

External links
 

1991 births
Living people
Bulgarian women's volleyball players
Place of birth missing (living people)
European Games competitors for Bulgaria
Volleyball players at the 2015 European Games
Opposite hitters
Expatriate volleyball players in Romania
Expatriate volleyball players in Italy
Expatriate volleyball players in Turkey
Expatriate volleyball players in Japan
Bulgarian expatriate sportspeople in Romania
Bulgarian expatriates in Italy
Bulgarian expatriate sportspeople in Turkey
Bulgarian expatriate sportspeople in Japan
Yeşilyurt volleyballers